MacMall is an authorized online reseller of Apple products. They buy Apple products in bulk, which allows them to sell them at a volume discount. MacMall is a wholly owned subsidiary of PCM, Inc.

History
Parent company PCM started out as a mail-order catalog company in 1987 at Marina del Rey, CA in the residence of its co-founders, brothers Sam and Frank Khulusi. PCM started out under the name "Creative Computers" and was the number one mail-order reseller of Amiga computers from Commodore International until its closure in April 1994. That same year, PCM obtained authorization to sell Apple computers.
In the first quarter of 1995, the company filed for initial public offering and listed on the NASDAQ in April 1995.
After a year of growth, PCM launched MacMall.com.

MacMall today
MacMall is the biggest online revenue-earner for PCM, Inc. and its subsidiaries.  At the end of 2010, total net sales of MacMall amounted to approximately US$200 million, which was 15% of the company's US$1.3 billion revenue for the year-end.

MacMall features
Mac On Call is the Apple-authorized service, installation, and advice center located on the store.

Creative Pro is a dedicated service that caters to creative professionals.

Executive leadership
MacMall.com is led by President Daniel J. DeVries. DeVries is based in El Segundo, CA. DeVries previously served as the Executive Vice President for Marketing of PCM.

Locations
MacMall Corporate Headquarters is located in El Segundo, CA and their distribution Center is located in Memphis, TN. MacMall also holds office in Montreal, Canada and Manila, Philippines.

References

 "MacMall Opens New Flagship Store", AllVoices.com.  (February 11, 2010)
 Homepage

Consumer electronics retailers in the United States